Specimens of Bushman Folklore is a book by the linguist Wilhelm H. I. Bleek and Lucy C. Lloyd, which was published in 1911. The book records eighty-seven legends, myths and other traditional stories of the ǀXam Bushmen in their now-extinct language. The stories were collected through interviews with various narrators, chief among them ǀA!kunta, ǁKabbo, Diäǃkwain, !Kweiten-ta-ǀǀKen and ǀHanǂkasso.

These tales were written down and translated by Bleek and his sister-in-law Lloyd. Bleek died in 1875, but Lloyd continued transcribing ǀXam narratives after his death. It is thanks to her efforts that some of the narratives were eventually published in this book, which also includes sketches of rock art attributed to the Bushmen people and some ǃXun narratives.

Specimens of Bushman Folklore has been considered the cornerstone of study of the Bushmen and their religious beliefs. Laurens van der Post describes the book (and Dorothea Bleek's Mantis and His Friend) as "a sort of Stone Age Bible" in the introduction to The Heart of the Hunter (1961), a follow-up to The Lost World of the Kalahari.

Specimens of Bushman Folklore, as well as the situation of the Bushmen during their disappearance in South Africa and the lives of Bleek and Lloyd, have been covered in a Dutch documentary series called The Broken String.

Further reading

Banks, Andrew. Bushmen in a Victorian World. Cape Town: Double Storey, 2006.

External links
Specimens of Bushman Folklore. (entire text)
 Specimens of Bushman Folklore. (scanned pages, with search)
 Diä!kwain, the 'soft-hearted' prisoner (an informant)
 /Xam (Bushmen and Bushwomen) Intellectuals (1845-1879) including the five informants of Bleek
Timeline of Southern African Art (entry under 1911)
University of Cape Town, Michaelis School of Fine Art: The Digital Bleek and Lloyd
documentary information (in Dutch)

1911 books
Anthropology books